Schefflera apiculata is a species of plant in the family Araliaceae. It is endemic to the Maluku Islands in Indonesia.

References

apiculata
Endemic flora of the Maluku Islands
Data deficient plants
Taxonomy articles created by Polbot